Shannon Flynn is an American television director. She is best known for her work on the sitcom Hannah Montana. Prior to this, she worked as dialogue coach. She also has directed episodes of Sonny with a Chance, Bella and the Bulldogs, Nicky, Ricky, Dicky & Dawn, Austin & Ally, Good Luck Charlie, The Haunted Hathaways, Jessie, The Thundermans and Instant Mom.

She is an alumna of the Yale School of Drama.

References

External links

American television directors
American women television directors
Living people
Yale School of Drama alumni
Place of birth missing (living people)
Year of birth missing (living people)